In applied mathematics and the calculus of variations, the first variation of a functional J(y) is defined as the linear functional  mapping the function h to

where y and h are functions, and ε is a scalar. This is recognizable as the Gateaux derivative of the functional.

Example

Compute the first variation of

From the definition above,

See also 
Calculus of variations
Functional derivative

Calculus of variations